Muddula Mogadu is a 1983 Indian Telugu-language romantic drama film, produced by Cherukuri Prakash Rao and directed by K. S. Prakash Rao. It stars Akkineni Nageswara Rao and Sridevi, with music composed by S. Rajeswara Rao. The film was released on 27 January 1983.

Plot 

Prasad is a popular stage artist and writer. Durga, a vainglory woman, daughter of a millionaire Gopala Rao loves and marries Prasad, being his fan. Soon after, as Prasad's income is little-bit low he is unable to bear spendthrift Durga. So, the time throws Prasad into debts, insults and spoils his health too. During that plight, Durga depends on her parents which hurts Prasad's individuality. At that juncture, a rift arises between the couple and Durga leaves the house. At last, Durga realises her mistake, understands the virtue of Prasad and pleads pardon. The film ends with the reunion of the couple.

Cast 
Akkineni Nageswara Rao as Prasad
Sridevi as Durga
Satyanarayana as Gopala Rao
Sarath Babu as Madhu
Nagesh as Simham
Dhulipala as Rangamartanda Madhavaiah
Mikkilineni
S. Varalakshmi
Suhasini as Sarala

Soundtrack 
Music composed by S. Rajeswara Rao. Lyrics were written by Acharya Aatreya. Music released on EMI Columbia Audio Company.

References

External links 
 

Films scored by S. Rajeswara Rao
Indian romantic drama films
Films directed by K. S. Prakash Rao